The harm principle holds that the actions of individuals should only be limited to prevent harm to other individuals. John Stuart Mill articulated this principle in On Liberty, where he argued that "The only purpose for which power can be rightfully exercised over any member of a civilized community, against his will, is to prevent harm to others."  An equivalent was earlier stated in France's Declaration of the Rights of Man and of the Citizen of 1789 as, "Liberty consists in the freedom to do everything which injures no one else; hence the exercise of the natural rights of each man has no limits except those which assure to the other members of the society the enjoyment of the same rights. These limits can only be determined by law."

Definition 
The belief "that no one should be forcibly prevented from acting in any way he chooses provided his acts are not invasive of the free acts of others" has become one of the basic principles of libertarian politics.

In R v Malmo-Levine, the Supreme Court of Canada claimed that there was no such thing as the harm principle, even though it had been found to be a principle of fundamental justice in the courts below and had been found in all the key documents in the formulation of the concept of justice in Western society, including but not limited to the first English and French Constitutions, John Stuart Mill’s On Liberty, and modern case law.

The Harm Principle is found in article 5 of the first English-language constitution from 1647: "An Agreement of the People for a firme and present Peace, upon grounds of common right and freedome . . .", presented to the Army Council, E. 412, 21. October 28, 1647:

The Harm Principle is found in articles 4 and 5 of the first French constitution (and first nationally-adopted constitution) from 1789: Declaration of Human and Civic Rights of 26 August 1789:

 
 
The harm principle was first fully articulated by the English philosopher John Stuart Mill [JSM] (1806–1873) in the first chapter of On Liberty (1859), where he argued that:

Mill also put the harm principle within his list of rights that sprung from liberty. It was found within his list of political rights (political activities that did not involve harm to others) - but also within his non-political liberty rights - his "tastes and pursuits" - activities which did not involve politics and did not involve harm to others:

One might rightly argue that the "pursuit of Happiness" mentioned in the 1776 US Declaration of Independence was one of the "tastes and pursuits" that Mill had in mind:

The Harm Principle is also found in recent US case law - in the case of the People v Alvarez, from the Supreme Court of California, in May, 2002:

The Harm Principle even found its way into the drug laws of Columbia, in 1994, and again in 2009:

In their decision in R v Malmo-Levine, the Supreme Court did not explain how the Harm Principle was both 1) not a principle of fundamental justice, and 2) found in all these sources of fundamental justice.

Even if a self-regarding action results in harm to oneself, it is still beyond the sphere of justifiable state coercion.

Harm itself is not a non-moral concept. The infliction of harm upon another person is what makes an action wrong.

Harm can also result from a failure to meet an obligation. Morality generates obligations. Duty may be exacted from a person in the same way as a debt, and it is part of the notion of duty that a person may be rightfully compelled to fulfill it.

Restrictions 
In On Liberty, J. S. Mill writes that his principle does not apply to persons judged as mentally ill, "barbarians" (which he assimilated to minors) and minors while the Declaration of the Rights of Man and of the Citizen did not concern women, slaves, foreigners and minors, as they were not citizens.

Modern interpretation of the principle often does not make distinction of race or sex.

Broader definitions of harm 

In the same essay, Mill further explains the principle as a function of two maxims:

The second of these maxims has become known as the social authority principle.

However, the second maxim also opens the question of broader definitions of harm, up to and including harm to the society. The concept of harm is not limited to harm to another individual but can be harm to individuals plurally, without specific definition of those individuals.

This is an important principle for the purpose of determining harm that only manifests gradually over time—such that the resulting harm can be anticipated, but does not yet exist at the time that the action causing harm was taken. It also applies to other issues—which range from the right of an entity to discharge broadly polluting waste on private property, to broad questions of licensing, and to the right of sedition.

Modern examples

In US libertarianism 

The United States Libertarian Party includes a version of the harm principle as part of its official party platform. It states:

Critique of Harm Principle 
Scholars  have argued that the harm principle does not provide a narrow scope of which actions count as harmful towards oneself or the population and it cannot be used to determine whether people can be punished for their actions by the state. A state can determine whether an action is punishable by determining what harm the action causes. If a morally unjust action occurs but leaves no indisputable form of harm, there is no justification for the state to act and punish the perpetrators for their actions. The harm principle has an ambiguous definition of what harm specifically is and what justifies a state to intervene.

Scholars  have also said that the harm principle does not specify on whether the state is justified with intervention tactics. This ambiguity can lead a state to define what counts as a harmful self-regarding action at its own discretion. This freedom might allow for an individual's own liberty and rights to be in danger. It would not be plausible for a state to intervene with an action that will negatively affect the population more than an individual. The harm principle scope of usage has been described as too wide to directly follow and implement possible punishment by a state.

See also
Ahimsa
Classical liberalism
Primum non nocere - "first, to do no harm."
Do no significant harm principle (DNSH)
Law of equal liberty
Libertarianism
Non-aggression principle
Wiccan Rede

References

Bibliography

External links
Baselines, at Legal Theory Blog.

Classical liberalism
Ethical principles
1859 introductions
John Stuart Mill